Larryleachia tirasmontana is a species of plant in the family Apocynaceae. It is endemic to Namibia.  Its natural habitat is cold desert.

References

Flora of Namibia
tirasmontana
Least concern plants
Taxonomy articles created by Polbot